Parklea is a suburb in Sydney, in the state of New South Wales, Australia. It is approximately 35 kilometres north-west of the Sydney central business district, in the local government area of the City of Blacktown and is a part of Greater Western Sydney. The suburb was named by the subdividers in the early 1900s and is well known for the major Sydney landmark of Parklea Markets.

Population
According to the 2016 census of Population, there were 3,465 people in Parklea.
 Aboriginal and Torres Strait Islander people made up 5.5% of the population. 
 54.5% of people were born in Australia. The next most common countries of birth were India 11.6%, Philippines 5.4% and Fiji 3.6%.   
 29.1% of people spoke only English at home. Other languages spoken at home included Hindi 6.5% and Punjabi 6.1%.

Landmarks 
Landmarks include:
 Parklea Correctional Centre
 Parklea Markets (Sunnyholt Road)
 Parklea Garden Village (transportable home village – across the road from Parklea Markets)
 Blacktown Leisure Centre

Transport 
Hillsbus provides services to Parramatta, Sydney CBD and Rouse Hill, whilst Busways provides services to Macquarie Park, Castle Hill and Blacktown. The suburb is served by Sorrento and Stanhope stations on the Blacktown-Parklea T-way.

Notable residents 
Doug Bollinger – Australian cricketer

References 

Suburbs of Sydney
City of Blacktown